Board of Control for Cricket in India (BCCI), is the governing body of cricket in India, It is a full member of the International Cricket Council (ICC), the international governing body of cricket. BCCI is made up of full and associate member associations. These member associations are grouped into zones, depending on their location in India, North zone, Central zone, East zone, West zone and South zone.

Most of the member associations govern cricket in their respective states while some govern the sport in their regions such as Mumbai, historic areas of Princely state such Hyderabad State, some govern it in Union territories such as Jammu and Kashmir, Pondicherry etc.,  government institutions such  as Army, Services and Universities.

Affiliated Members
Membership of the Board of Control for Cricket in India is made up of Full Members and Associate Members.

Full Members 
The majority of full members are state cricket associations. Each state is permitted one representative, except for Gujarat and Maharashtra, which have three. There are additional representatives from Indian Railways, Services and Universities. Changes recommended by the Lodha Committee included restricting full membership to state associations and limiting states to one full member, with the others becoming associate members, but these have not been fully adopted by the BCCI, with existing members retaining full membership except for Cricket Club of India (Mumbai) and National Cricket Club (Kolkata).

Associate Members 
All members not meeting the criteria for full members are classified as associate members. They include:

See also
 BCCI domestic teams
 List of Indian state football associations

Notes

References

External links
 Official BCCI Website

Indian cricket lists
Cricket administration in India